Rhabdopterus weisei is a species of leaf beetle. It is found in North America. It was originally described under the name Colaspis subaenea by the American entomologist Charles Frederic August Schaeffer in 1919. However, this name was already used for a species described by Martin Jacoby in 1890, so Schaeffer renamed his species to Colaspis weisei the following year. It was later moved to the genus Rhabdopterus by Herbert Spencer Barber in 1943.

The species was synonymised with Rhabdopterus praetextus by William T. Schultz in 1977, but was restored as a valid species in 2001.

References

Further reading

 

Eumolpinae
Articles created by Qbugbot
Beetles described in 1920
Beetles of the United States
Taxa named by Charles Frederic August Schaeffer